Gobowen railway station is a railway station on the Shrewsbury to Chester Line of the former Great Western Railway's London Paddington to Birkenhead Woodside via Birmingham Snow Hill line, serving the village of Gobowen in Shropshire, England. It is the nearest station to the town of Oswestry.

History 

The station building was designed by Thomas Mainwaring Penson, and is a Grade II listed building. The station was built between 1846 and 1848 by the Shrewsbury and Chester Railway in a notable Florentine (or Italianate) style with white stucco facing and a small turret. The awnings and the footbridge were added later by the Great Western Railway (the footbridge was demolished in 1987). Although a very small village, Gobowen was the junction station for the much larger regional town of Oswestry some three miles away. When rail services to Oswestry ceased in November 1966, Gobowen was retained as the railhead for the surrounding area. There is a scheme in progress to open this branch as a heritage railway. Until 1967 Gobowen was served by the GWR, latterly BR Western Region, express services between London Paddington and Birkenhead Woodside.

Severn-Dee Travel was established in 1995 and managed by the late David Lloyd, who was also a keen campaigner for the restoration of a direct rail link between the area and London. Following his death, the Wrexham & Shropshire locomotive 67015 was named in his honour, and a replica nameplate from the locomotive can be seen in the booking office.

Future 
Gobowen station may become the northern terminus of the proposed Cambrian Heritage Railways line to Llynclys, Pant and Blodwel via Oswestry. Shropshire Council was to acquire the coal yard at Gobowen for railway-related uses, including car parking for the station. If the plans are fully realised, the station would have three platforms, one of which would be for the Heritage Railway.

Gobowen is also planned to have direct services to and from London Euston by Avanti West Coast from December 2022 after extension of the service between London Euston and Wrexham General.

Facilities 

The main building, which was renovated in 2005, is used as small business space. The booking office is now located in the waiting room on the southbound platform. Unusually, it is not operated directly by the train operating company but by an independent travel agent, Severn-Dee Travel. It is staffed on weekdays from 07:15 to 16:00 and on Saturdays from 07:15 to midday.  At other times tickets must be purchased on the train.

A vending machine and disabled access toilet is located in the ticket hall. Train running information is offered via CIS displays, timetable posters and automatic announcements. Level access to both platforms is via the staffed barrier level crossing at the north end which is controlled from the adjacent signal box.

There are no waiting shelters, but canopies are provided on both platforms:
 Platform 1 - For southbound services to Shrewsbury, Cardiff Central or Birmingham New Street
 Platform 2 - For northbound services to Wrexham General, Chester or Holyhead

Services 

, train services run on two routes:
 Transport for Wales service from Birmingham International to Holyhead.
 Transport for Wales service from Holyhead to Cardiff.

Others at the start and end of day run between Chester and Shrewsbury only, though there is also one late evening weekday through train to Manchester Piccadilly and three that run to  rather than Holyhead (with one in the opposite direction). On Sundays, there is a two-hourly service (with occasional extras) each way, mostly running between Chester and Birmingham International (though there are three trains to Holyhead and two to Cardiff).

References

Further reading

External links 

 Chester to Shrewsbury Rail Partnership

Grade II listed buildings in Shropshire
Grade II listed railway stations
Railway stations in Shropshire
DfT Category E stations
Former Great Western Railway stations
Railway stations in Great Britain opened in 1848
Railway stations served by Transport for Wales Rail
Thomas Mainwaring Penson railway stations